The Andhra Pradesh Residential School (or APRST), is a residential school in Guntur of the Indian state of Andhra Pradesh. It was established in the year 1972 by the Government of Andhra Pradesh, in conjunction with the Andhra Pradesh Residential Educational Institutions Society (APREIS). APREIS is an autonomous body with state funding for the development of rural residential education.

References 

Schools in Guntur district
Boarding schools in Andhra Pradesh
Educational institutions established in 1972
1972 establishments in Andhra Pradesh